Charlotte Marie Pomeline Casiraghi (born 3 August 1986) is a Monégasque model, socialite, writer, editor, equestrian, journalist, film producer, and humanitarian. She is the second child and only daughter of Caroline, Princess of Hanover, and Stefano Casiraghi, an Italian industrialist. She is eleventh in line to the throne of Monaco. Her maternal grandparents were Rainier III, Prince of Monaco, and American actress Grace Kelly. She is named after her maternal great-grandmother, Princess Charlotte, Duchess of Valentinois.

Early life
Charlotte Casiraghi was born in Princess Grace Hospital Centre in La Colle, Monaco on 3 August 1986 to Princess Caroline of Monaco and Stefano Casiraghi. She was christened on 20 September 1986. Her godparents are Albina du Boisrouvray and Stefano Casiraghi's brother-in-law, Massimo Bianchi. She has two brothers: Andrea (b. 1984) and Pierre (b. 1987). When she was four years old, her father was killed in a boating accident. After his death, Princess Caroline moved the family to the Midi village of Saint-Rémy-de-Provence  in France, with the intention of minimising their exposure to the press.

In January 1999, Charlotte gained a stepfather and two stepbrothers, (Prince Ernst of Hanover and Prince Christian of Hanover), when her mother married Ernst August, Prince of Hanover. Six months later, Casiraghi's half-sister, Princess Alexandra of Hanover, was born at a clinic in Vöcklabruck, Austria. Casiraghi is one of the godmothers to her sister. The family then moved to the Parisian suburb of Fontainebleau.

From 2001 through 2004, as a member of Marcel Rozier's Team Marionnaud, Casiraghi participated in a number of Junior and Amateur class show jumping competitions. She was trained by his son Thierry Rozier.

Education
From the ages of two to six, Casiraghi attended Les Dames de Saint Maur, which is part of the Catholic schools of François d'Assise Nicolas Barré in Monaco. At the age of six, she moved on to the École de la République (state school system) in Saint-Rémy-de-Provence. From 2000 to 2004 she attended the Lycée François-Couperin, Fontainebleau.

She obtained an "excellent" (in French: très bien, the highest possible) mark on her baccalaureate exam in July 2004. After passing her bac, she enrolled in the hypokhâgne and khâgne course at the Lycée Fénelon, in St-Germain-des-Près, Paris, in the hope of entering the École normale supérieure (Paris). She took the written entrance exam for ENS in June 2006, but failed to make the list of candidates eligible to proceed to the oral exam.

In 2007, Casiraghi earned a License of Philosophy (B.A.) from the University of Paris IV: Paris-Sorbonne; Casiraghi completed two internships, firstly with the publishing house of Robert Laffont in Paris, and then later from October 2007 with the Sunday magazine supplement of The Independent newspaper of London. In 2018, Casiraghi told Clara Le Fort of Billionaire magazine: "I continued studying philosophy while at the Sciences Po Doctoral School."

Career

Fashion and modelling 
In 2010, Casiraghi became the official ambassador for the equestrian collections of Gucci. In 2014, she became the face of Gucci Cosmetics. Casiraghi modelled for Yves Saint Laurent's campaign for its Fall 2018 collection, giving it the hashtag #YSL15. Casiraghi was photographed by David Sims to be the face of the campaign.

Casiraghi modeled for the lens of Collier Schorr in the eighth issue of System magazine. In a gender fluid framework, Casiraghi modeled clothing from the Gucci menswear line. On 22 December 2020, Casiraghi became the brand ambassador of Chanel. She was the global face for Chanel's Spring/Summer 2021 campaign.

In 2018, Casiraghi collaborated with Montblanc on a line of jewellery called Les Aimants and inspired by Nancy Cunard.

Philosophy
In 2015, Casiraghi founded Les Rencontres Philosophiques de Monaco (literally, "Philosophical Encounters"). Her co-founders include her former teacher in Fontainebleau, the philosopher Robert Maggiori. The others founders are Joseph Cohen and Raphael Zagury-Orly. Her mother is among the many honorary members of the group, which is really a think tank on philosophy. They discuss contemporary issues and new publications in the field of philosophy. The writings and the life of Anne Dufourmantelle made a strong impact on Casiraghi, who wrote in particular about Dufourmantelle's book Défense du Secret in an article for Libération. Casiraghi and Dufourmantelle, who died in 2017, were friends, sharing, by the admission of Casiraghi herself, a passion for not only philosophy but for horses.

Casiraghi wrote the preface for a book published in 2017 by the psychoanalyst Julia Kristeva. The two women also published their letters to each other, reflecting on philosophy.

In March 2018, Casiraghi and Maggiori published their Kindle book, through Éditions du Seuil. The title is Archipel des Passions (Archipelago of the Passions). It is a series of dialogues between the professor and the student about the various passions (i.e. arrogance, joy, cruelty, love) and their affects. It is also "an essay on the passion of thought." The book is dedicated to her father and the passions explored amount to about forty. It "reads like a treatise of the passions."

Equestrianism
In June 2009, Casiraghi, accompanied by her uncle Albert II, Prince of Monaco, appeared on the French television programme Stade 2 to speak about her recent enrollment in the Global Champions Tour.

Since returning to the show jumping sport in April 2009 (after a four-year hiatus), she continues to train with Thierry Rozier. Casiraghi and the bay gelding named GI Joe (owner: Jan Tops), participated in the 2009 Global Champions Tour in Valencia, Spain, Monte Carlo, Cannes, Estoril, Rio de Janeiro, and Valkenswaard.

Casiraghi continued participation in the Global Champions Tour throughout 2010. For the most part, she rode horses Troy (a chestnut stallion) and Tintero (a grey gelding). The GCT "Pro-Am Cup" (Professional-Amateur) relay was her original concept. It is a staple of the GCT Monaco event to this day.

In 2010, she assumed the role of honorary president of the Global Champions Tour (now the Longines Global Champions Tour) in Monaco; her mother had been honorary president of the event as it existed prior to its inclusion in the Global Champions Tour. Since 2015, Casiraghi never participated in multiple phases of the Longines Global Champions Tour. After that year, she reduced her participation to the Monaco phase only.

Journalism
Casiraghi is a published writer and magazine editor. Her credits include work for AnOther Magazine (its issue for January 2008) and the Sunday supplement to the British The Independent newspaper in the late months of 2007. She was the editor-at-large for Above magazine in 2009. With two friends, she left that role in order to focus on the founding of the ecological/fashion-related Ever Manifesto.

Through her work as the editor-at-large for Above magazine, Casiraghi befriended Stella McCartney, whom she interviewed for the magazine's first issue. McCartney enlightened Casiraghi and readers as to the many ways the fashion industry can harm the ecosystem. Also for Above, Casiraghi was reported in Women's Wear Daily as being  "instrumental in securing an interview with Gomorrah author Roberto Saviano (which took place in hiding thanks to Saviano's dissection of the Mafia)."

On 21 September 2009, Casiraghi announced plans to publish 3,000 copies of Ever Manifesto, a free publication on what she considers the fashion industry's harmful impact on the global environment and to promote sustainability in fashion. Casiraghi revealed that her collaborators with the Loro Piana-funded project are the socialite Alexia Niedzielski and advertising executive Elizabeth von Guttman. She also revealed that the environmentally conscious designer Stella McCartney, as well as her own uncle Prince Albert II, greatly enlightened and influenced her. Specifically, she said: "It's only recently that I've questioned the way that I've been consuming. I haven't been as conscious as I should have been."

The debut issue of Ever Manifesto was distributed free at the 10 Corso Como boutique during Milan Fashion Week and again at Colette in Paris during Paris Fashion Week. Casiraghi explained that the magazine will not have a predetermined publication schedule. "We want to publish when we have something to say or people to support," she said. "It will be short and meaningful so that people will read it."

The day after the publication of her La Stampa interview, 22 September, Casiraghi joined her partners, Niedzielski and Guttman, at the gallery of Michelangelo Pistoletto, in the town of Biella, in the Italian region of Piedmont. Along with the artist and the Vogue Italia editor-in-chief Franca Sozzani, Casiraghi unveiled plans for Ever Manifesto and the Città dell'arte Fashion: Bio Ethical Sustainable Trend.

In October 2009, Casiraghi was a guest at the Stella McCartney show in Paris. Sitting in the front row with Dasha Zhukova, Paul McCartney and Gwyneth Paltrow, she told Women's Wear Daily about Ever Manifesto. Copies of the magazine's first issue were left on the seats before the show. "We will announce [succeeding issues] on the website soon," she said.

Casiraghi contributed to the October 2009 issue of 20, the free newspaper of Alex Dellal's gallery, 20 Hoxton Square Projects.

Film
Casiraghi founded Swoon Productions in 2012 that focused on equestrian films. In 2014, Casiraghi bought the rights to the book Our Lady of the Nile, which was released as a feature film in 2020, in which she was one of the producers.

Philanthropy 
Casiraghi is a private citizen, but occasionally attends official functions in Monaco, such as a fundraising gala for AMADE Mondiale and Nelson Mandela's foundation in September 2007. In 2006, she made her debut appearance at Monaco's Rose Ball (in French: Bal de la Rose), which also raises money for the Princess Grace Foundation. In 2015, she joined the board of directors of FXB France, an organization founded by her godmother Albina du Boisrouvray in 1989 to combat AIDS and poverty.

As a child, she was Monegasque delegate to the Club des Habits Rouges. At the same time, her grandfather Rainier III, Prince of Monaco designated her patron of the Public Safety Division in Monaco.

Personal life
At the age of 16, Casiraghi was named number ten on a list of the world's most eligible young women. Vanity Fair selected Casiraghi as one of the International Best Dressed List of 2006.

Casiraghi is often photographed at fashion shows, art exhibits, and equestrian events.

In December 2011, Casiraghi started dating stand-up comedian and actor Gad Elmaleh. Their son, Raphaël, was born on Tuesday, 17 December 2013. As Raphaël's parents were not married, he is not included in the line of succession to the Monegasque throne. The couple split in June 2015.

In March 2018, several credible media sources reported her engagement to Dimitri Rassam, the son of French actress Carole Bouquet, and it was widely noted that she wore a diamond ring at Monaco's Rose Ball on 24 March. Casiraghi was visibly pregnant by the summer and the couple chose to postpone a wedding until after the birth of their child. On 23 October 2018, Casiraghi gave birth to a second child, a son named Balthazar. The couple married civilly at the Prince's Palace of Monaco on 1 June 2019. They celebrated in a reception at nearby hotel Villa La Vigie.

On 29 June 2019, they married religiously at the Abbey of Sainte-Marie de Pierredon, outside Saint-Rémy-de-Provence.

Publications
Archipel des Passions (H.C. ESSAIS). By Charlotte Casiraghi and Robert Maggiori. Published by Éditions du Seuil, 1 March 2018. 
Everlution. Ever Manifesto. First Issue. October 2009.
Ever Bamboo. Ever Manifesto. Second Issue. June 2011.

See also
 Ever Manifesto
 Global Champions Tour

External links

 Philo Monaco website
 Palais Princier de Monaco (official)
 Lycée François Couperin
 Hello! Profile: Charlotte Casiraghi

References

1986 births
House of Grimaldi
Living people
University of Paris alumni
Monegasque people of Irish descent
Monegasque people of Italian descent
Monegasque people of American descent
Monegasque female equestrians
Monegasque show jumping riders
Kelly family
Monegasque writers
Monegasque women writers
Magazine writers
Magazine editors
Royalty and nobility models